Mein Jeena Chahti Hoon is a 2020 Pakistani family drama television series premiered on PTV Home & Express Entertainment on 24 January 2020. It is produced by Satish Anand under Eveready Pictures. It has Nimra Khan, Kamran Jilani and Hammad Farooqui in lead roles.

Plot 
The story revolves around Sara (Nimra Khan) who is the only  child of Khan Sahab (Manzoor Qureshi). Sara's mother died when she was young. Khan Sahab does not have any connection with his relatives because after his mother's death, his brother took possession on the property and belongings and Khan Sahab in retaliation breaks the connection with his brother and relatives. Time passes and Sara is now 20, young University going girl. She has a friend Tabinda who is very close to her. Tabinda's brother Taimur likes Sara but never share his feelings to Tabinda neither to Sara. One day Khan Sahab met Usman at Golf course and found him well established man, working in a multi-national firm. He invites Usman at his house. On the other hand, Sara's Uncle (Khan Sahab)'s brother sends proposal of his son Shafiq for Sara because of her property which Khan Sahab rejected. Later on, after the doctors inform Khan Sahab that he has serious illness, he forces Usman to marry Sara.

Cast 
 Nimra Khan as Sara
 Kamran Jilani as Usman
 Hammad Farooqui as Taimur
 Adnan Shah as Shafiq Khan
 Manzoor Qureshi as Khan Sahab
 Hajra Khan as Rabia
 Hashim Butt as Raheem; Taimur's father
 Beena Chaudhary as Shaista; Taimur's mother
 Sabahat Ali Bukhari as Rania
 Sohail Asghar as Nawaz Khan; Sara's uncle
 Ghazala Butt as Suriya
 Hanif Bachchan as Taimur's father
 Abeer Qureshi as Tabinda
 Malik Raza as Sultan

References 

2020 Pakistani television series debuts
Pakistani drama television series
Urdu-language television shows